No New Land is a novel by M. G. Vassanji, published in 1991. The action is largely set in Dar es Salaam and Toronto. The title is derivited from Lawrence Durrell's novel The Alexandria Quartet, in which he translates Constantine P. Cavafy's "The City".

1991 Canadian novels
Novels by M. G. Vassanji
Novels set in Toronto
Novels set in Tanzania
McClelland & Stewart books
Culture in Dar es Salaam